Luis Antonio de Castro y Castillo (died 1653) was a Roman Catholic prelate who served as Bishop of La Paz (1647–1653).

Biography
Luis Antonio de Castro y Castillo was born in Alcala la Real.
On 13 September 1647, he was selected as Bishop of La Paz and confirmed by Pope Innocent X on 13 January 1648.
On 26 April 1648, he was consecrated bishop by Juan de Arguinao y Gutiérrez, Bishop of Santa Cruz de la Sierra. 
He served as Bishop of La Paz until his death on 7 October 1653.

References

External links and additional sources
 (for Chronology of Bishops) 
 (for Chronology of Bishops) 

17th-century Roman Catholic bishops in Bolivia
Bishops appointed by Pope Innocent X
1653 deaths
Roman Catholic bishops of La Paz